Aldama Municipality may refer to:
 Aldama Municipality, Chiapas
 Aldama Municipality, Chihuahua
 Aldama Municipality, Tamaulipas

Municipality name disambiguation pages